Ugolsky is a rural locality (a khutor) in Stezhenskoye Rural Settlement, Alexeyevsky District, Volgograd Oblast, Russia. The population was 87 as of 2015.

Geography 
Ugolsky is located 15 km southwest of Alexeyevskaya (the district's administrative centre) by road. Ust-Buzulukskaya is the nearest rural locality.

References 

Rural localities in Alexeyevsky District, Volgograd Oblast